The Vilnius Academy of Arts (previously State Art Institute of Lithuania) in Vilnius, Lithuania, grants a variety of degrees in the arts.

History
The Academy traces its roots back to the creation of the Architecture Department at Vilnius University in the former Grand Duchy of Lithuania in 1793. The Department of Painting and Drawing was established in 1797, followed by the Department of Graphics (Engraving), and in 1805 – the Departments of Sculpture and History of art. In 1832, the university was closed, and reopened in 1919 with departments of Painting, Sculpture and Graphic Art. In 1940, the art studies in Lithuania were united under Vilnius Art Institute and Kaunas Art School. Later, the Academy saw several re-organisations, and in 1990 the name of Vilnius Academy of Arts was reinstated.

The academy began working with UNESCO in 2000, when the UNESCO department of culture management and culture policy was created.

The museum of the Academy holds about 12,000 pieces, ranging from the 16th century to the works of its most recent students and graduates.

Notable alumni
Danas Andriulionis, Lithuanian artist
Rūta Jokubonienė
Arūnas Rutkus
Vytautas Tomaševičius
Gražina Didelytė
Algis Uždavinys
Jurga Ivanauskaitė
Kristina Sabaliauskaitė

References

 
Art schools in Lithuania
Universities and colleges in Vilnius
1793 establishments in the Polish–Lithuanian Commonwealth
Educational institutions established in 1793
18th-century establishments in Lithuania